The 1960 Sacramento State Hornets football team represented Sacramento State College—now known as California State University, Sacramento—as a member of the Far Western Conference (FWC) during the 1960 NCAA College Division football season. Led by John W. Baker in his fourth and final season as head coach, Sacramento State compiled an overall record of 5–5 with a mark of 2–3 in conference play, tying for third place in the FWC. For the season the team outscored its opponents 163 to 132. The Hornets played home games at Charles C. Hughes Stadium in Sacramento, California.

Schedule

Notes

References

Sacramento State
Sacramento State Hornets football seasons
Sacramento State Hornets football